Alfred Schwarz (born 16 November 1887, date of death unknown) was a Russian Empire athlete. He competed in the men's standing high jump at the 1912 Summer Olympics.

References

1887 births
Year of death missing
Athletes (track and field) at the 1912 Summer Olympics
Male high jumpers from the Russian Empire
Olympic competitors for the Russian Empire
Athletes from Saint Petersburg